is a compilation album by Japanese idol girl group Nogizaka46. It contains songs performed by, and written for, "Under" members of Nogizaka46, who are not part of the main selection group for major single releases. It was released on January 10, 2018, and reached the top position on the weekly Oricon Albums Chart.

Release 
This album was released in 3 versions: a first press specification limited edition, a first press production limited edition, and a regular edition. The CD tracks are identical for all releases.

Track listing
All lyrics written by Yasushi Akimoto.

Disc 1

Disc 2

Weekly charts

References

Nogizaka46 albums
Japanese-language albums
2018 albums